Park Soo-jin (born November 27, 1985) is a South Korean actress, singer and model. She was a member of K-pop girl group Sugar from 2001 to 2006, then she transitioned to acting in 2007. Park has also hosted Tasty Road since 2010, a cable show that features trendy restaurants in Seoul.

Personal life
Park married actor and KeyEast chairman Bae Yong-joon on July 27, 2015 at the Sheraton Grande Walkerhill Hotel; they announced their engagement in May 2015. The couple's first child, a boy, was born on 23 October 2016.
In August 2017, it was revealed that Park is in the early stages of pregnancy with her second child. Park gave birth to a girl on April 10, 2018.

Filmography

Television series

Film

Variety show

Music video

Discography

References

External links

 Park Soo-jin at KeyEast
 
 

South Korean television actresses
South Korean film actresses
South Korean female idols
IHQ (company) artists
1985 births
Living people
People from Seongnam